This Earthly Spell is the fourth studio album by Scottish folk musician Karine Polwart, released on 10 March 2008. The album was released just three months after Fairest Floo'er, and contains original compositions.

"The Good Years" previously appeared on Ballads of the Book. "Firethief" was originally written for and appeared in The Radio Ballads 2006.

"Rivers Run" was also issued as a one-track promo CD to publicise the album.

Track listing
All songs by Karine Polwart, except where noted.

"The Good Years" (Polwart/Edwin Morgan)
"Sorry"
"Better Things"
"Rivers Run"
"Painted It White"
"Firethief"
"Behind Our Eyes"
"The News"
"Sorrowlessfield" (Karine Polwart / Steven Polwart)
"Tongue That Cannot Lie"

Karine Polwart albums
2008 albums